Mahakama Football Club is a football club in Nairobi, Kenya. They played in the top level of Kenyan professional football, the Kenyan Premier League, but were relegated in 2008. It was founded in 2000 and is owned by the Judiciary of Kenya ("Mahakama" is Kiswahili for court).

In 2009 the team won the Nationwide League, earning a promotion back to the Premier League.

References

Kenyan Premier League clubs
Kenyan National Super League clubs
FKF Division One clubs
Association football clubs established in 2000
Football clubs in Kenya
Sport in Nairobi
2000 establishments in Kenya
Works association football clubs in Kenya